Malone-Dufort Airport  is two miles west of Malone, a village in the Town of Malone, Franklin County, New York. The FAA's National Plan of Integrated Airport Systems for 2009–2013 categorized it as a general aviation facility.

Many U.S. airports use the same three-letter location identifier for the FAA and IATA, but this facility is MAL to the FAA and has no IATA code (IATA assigned MAL to Mangole, Indonesia).

The first airline flights were Colonial DC-3s in 1948; successor Eastern pulled out in 1959.

Facilities
It has two asphalt runways: 5/23 is 4,000 by 100 feet (1,219 x 30 m) and 14/32 is 3,245 by 75 feet (989 x 23 m).

In the year ending December 7, 2007 the airport had 8,700 aircraft operations, average 23 per day: 92% general aviation, 6% air taxi, and 2% military. 14 aircraft were then based at the airport: 86% single-engine and 14% multi-engine.

References

External links 
 Malone-Dufort (MAL) airport diagram from New York State DOT
 Aerial image as of May 1994 from USGS The National Map
 
 

Airports in New York (state)
Transportation in Franklin County, New York